Vampire Assassin is a 2005 direct-to-DVD film directed, written by, and starring martial artist Ron Hall. The film is notable for its cameo from Rudy Ray Moore in one of his final roles.

Plot
When protagonist Derek Washington (Hall) was just a child, he witnessed his father's murder.  Because of this, he became very afraid of blood.  However, when a sting operation to find a counterfeiter named Gustoff Slovak (Mel Novak) goes wrong, Derek is forced to face his fear: blood. The operation backfires, resulting in a massacre that leaves Derek's team wiped out. Derek reaches the shocking conclusion that Slovak is actually a vampire, and joins forces with a weapons expert named Master Kao (Gerald Okamura). Kao is the last in a long line of vampire hunters, and agrees to train Derek in this ancient art of vampire slaying. However, in order to defeat Slovak, Derek must become a vampire assassin.

Legacy
In 2017, the film was featured on a Halloween-themed episode of Red Letter Media's Best of the Worst, together with Hack-O-Lantern and Cathy's Curse. The film was poorly received, with the hosts noting its misleading cover art and low production value, and comparing it unfavorably to the film Blade. The episode concluded with the hosts destroying their copies of the film in a skit parodying a scene from Hack-O-Lantern.

References

External links
 
 
 

2005 direct-to-video films
2005 horror films
Films shot in Los Angeles
American independent films
American vampire films
2005 films
2000s English-language films
2000s American films